Giacomo Orefice (27 August 1865 – 22 December 1922) was an Italian composer.

He was born in Vicenza.  He studied under Alessandro Busi and Luigi Mancinelli at the  Liceo Musicale di Bologna, and later became professor of composition at the Milan Conservatory.  He died in Milan in 1922.

His works include:

Operas
 L'oasi (1885)
 Mariska (1889)
 Consuelo (1895, after George Sand's novel; the title role was created by Cesira Ferrani, who the following year created Mimí in Puccini's La bohème)
 Il gladiatore (1898)
 Chopin (1901); Orefice's most successful work in which he incorporated music by Frédéric Chopin, arranged as arias and duets; it depicts a rather fanciful interpretation of some events in Chopin's life and the operatic arrangements are not highly regarded (Scott "Record of Singing" Duckworth Press, 1978). Excerpts recorded by the tenors Amadeo Bassi, Enzo Leliva and others c1903 to 1905. At the time also performed in Polish.
 Cecilia (1902)
 Mosè (1905)
 Pane altrui (1907)
 Radda (1912, after Maxim Gorky's short story Makar Chudra)
 Il castello del sogno (not produced)

Ballet
 La Soubrette (1907)

Orchestral
 Symphony in D minor
 Sinfonia del bosco
 Anacreontiche (4 movements: Ad Artemide, A Faune, Ad Eros, A Dionisio)

Concertos
 Cello Concerto

Chamber
 Riflessioni ed ombre (quintet)
 Piano Trio
 2 violin sonatas
 cello sonata

Piano
 Preludi del mare
 Quadri di Böcklin
 Crespuscoli
 Miraggi

Songs
 various songs.

Sources
 Grove's Dictionary of Music and Musicians, 5th ed., 1954

References

External links
 

1865 births
1922 deaths
19th-century classical composers
19th-century Italian composers
20th-century classical composers
20th-century Italian composers
Italian ballet composers
Conservatorio Giovanni Battista Martini alumni
Italian classical composers
Italian male classical composers
Italian opera composers
Male opera composers
Academic staff of Milan Conservatory
People from Vicenza
20th-century Italian male musicians
19th-century Italian male musicians